Loo or LOO may refer to:

Places 
 Loo Microdistrict, a historic district of Sochi, Russia
 Loo, Estonia, a small borough in Jõelähtme Parish, Harju County, Estonia
 Loo village, Estonia, a village in Jõelähtme Parish, Harju County, Estonia
 Looe, a town in Cornwall, United Kingdom
 Loo, Duiven, a village in the province of Gelderland in the Netherlands
 Loo (Overijssel), a village in the province of Overijssel in the Netherlands
 Loo (Bernheze), a village in the municipality of Berheze in the province of North Brabant in the Netherlands
 Loo (Bergeijk), a village in the municipality of Bergeijk in the province of North Brabant in the Netherlands
 Loo (Uden), a village in the municipality of Uden in the province of North Brabant in the Netherlands
 Waterloo, Ontario, shortened as 'Loo or "The 'Loo"
 Lu (state), birthplace of Confucius (transliteration as used e.g. in translations by James Legge)

Buildings 
 Het Loo Palace, palace in the Netherlands
 Hofje van Loo, courtyard in Haarlem, the Netherlands

Transport 
 LOO, the IATA code for L'Mekrareg Airport in Algeria
 LOO, the National Rail code for Looe railway station in the UK

Language 
 Loo language, an Adamawa language of Nigeria
 loo, the ISO 639-3 code for the Lombo language, spoken by the Turumbu people in the Democratic Republic of the Congo

Other uses 
 Loo (surname)
 Loo (novel), Nepali novel by Nayan Raj Pandey
 Big Loo, a toy robot manufactured by Louis Marx and Company for the holiday season of 1963
 Loo (wind), a strong, hot and dry wind which blows over Northern and parts of Western India during day time in summer
 Loo (card game), also known as Lanterloo, a card game
 Loo, informal term for a toilet
 Loo, a unicorn in L. Frank Baum's The Magic of Oz
 Loo table, a round or oval table on a pillar, with a hinged top. Originally used when playing the card game, Loo

See also 
 Lieu (disambiguation)
 Loos (disambiguation)